A Christogram is a monogram or combination of letters that forms an abbreviation for the name of Jesus Christ, traditionally used as a religious symbol within the Christian Church.

One of the oldest Christograms is the Chi-Rho (☧). It consists of the superimposed Greek letters chi  and rho , which are the first two letters of the Greek , 'Christ'. It was displayed on the  military standard used by Constantine I in 312 CE. The IX monogram is a similar form, using the initials of the name , 'Jesus (the) Christ', as is the ΙΗ monogram, using the first two letters of the name , 'JESUS' in uppercase.

There were a very considerable number of variants of "Christograms" or monograms of Christ in use during the medieval period, with the boundary between specific monograms and mere scribal abbreviations somewhat fluid.

The name Jesus, spelt  in Greek capitals, has the abbreviations IHS (also written JHS, IHC, or ΙΗΣ), the name Christus , spelt , has XP (and inflectional variants such as IX, XPO, XPS, XPI, XPM).

Similarly, the Middle Latin ,  refers to the Chi-Rho monogram specifically.

Chi (Χ) 

In antiquity, the cross, i.e. the instrument of Christ's crucifixion, was taken to be T-shaped, while the X-shape ("chiasmus") had different connotations. There has been scholarly speculation on the development of the Christian cross, the letter Chi used to abbreviate the name of Christ, and the various pre-Christian symbolism associated with the chiasmus interpreted in terms of "the mystery of the pre-existent Christ".

In Plato's , it is explained that the two bands which form the "world soul" cross each other like the letter Chi, possibly referring to the ecliptic crossing the celestial equator:

 

An early statement may be the phrase in Didache, "sign of extension in heaven".

He said that Christian bishops reframed this as a Christian symbol.

The most commonly encountered Christogram in English-speaking countries in modern times is the Χ (or more accurately, Chi), representing the first letter of the word Christ, in such abbreviations as Xmas (for "Christmas") and Xian or Xtian (for "Christian").

Chi Rho (ΧΡ) 

The Alpha and Omega symbols may at times accompany the Chi-Rho monogram. Since the 17th century,  (also ) has been used as a New Latin term for the Chi Rho monogram.

St Cuthbert's coffin (late 7th century) has an exceptional realisation of the Christogram written in Anglo-Saxon runes, as ᛁᚻᛋ ᛉᛈᛋ, transliterated to the Latin alphabet as 'IHS XPS', with the chi rendered as the eolh rune (the old z or algiz rune) and the rho rendered as the p-rune.

IHS 

The Greek letter iota is represented by 'I', and the eta by 'H', while the Greek letter sigma is either in its lunate form, represented by 'C', or its final form, represented by 'S'. Because the Latin-alphabet letters I and J were not systematically distinguished until the 17th century, "JHS" and "JHC" are equivalent to "IHS" and "IHC".

English-language interpretations of "IHS" have included "In His Service". Such interpretations are known as backformed acronyms. 

Used in Latin since the seventh century, the first use of IHS in an English document dates from the fourteenth century, in Piers Plowman. In the 15th century, Saint Bernardino of Siena popularized the use of the three letters on the background of a blazing sun to displace both popular pagan symbols and seals of political factions like the Guelphs and Ghibellines in public spaces (see Feast of the Holy Name of Jesus).

The IHS monogram with the H surmounted by a cross above three nails and surrounded by a Sun is the emblem of the Jesuits, according to tradition introduced by Ignatius of Loyola in 1541.

IHS has been known to appear on gravestones, especially among Irish Catholics.

ICXC 
In Eastern Christianity, the most widely used Christogram is a four-letter abbreviation, ΙϹ ΧϹ—a traditional abbreviation of the Greek words for 'Jesus Christ' (i.e., the first and last letters of each of the words , with the lunate sigma 'Ϲ' common in medieval Greek), and written with titlo (diacritic) denoting scribal abbreviation.

On icons, this Christogram may be split: 'ΙϹ' on the left of the image and 'ΧϹ' on the right. It is sometimes rendered as 'ΙϹ ΧϹ ΝΙΚΑ', meaning 'Jesus Christ Conquers'. 'ΙϹΧϹ' may also be seen inscribed on the Ichthys.

Lhq 

However, during the Edo period (1603–1867), Christians were persecuted and forced to hide. Because they were forbidden to openly worship the images of Christ or Mary, it is believed that they transferred their worship to other carved images and marked them with secret symbols understood only by the initiates. The 'Lhq' monogram corresponds to the distorted letters 'IHS'.

See also 
 Christian symbolism
 Holy Name of Jesus
 INRI
 Little Sachet
 Names and titles of Jesus
 Nomina sacra

References

Notes

Citations

Sources

External links 

 

Christian iconography
Christian symbols
Christian terminology
Monograms
Names of Jesus